GO Transit, the interregional public transit system in Southern Ontario, has a number of various road and rail vehicles. This includes 90 locomotives, 979 train coaches, and 752 buses.

Rail

Locomotives
Active
The vast majority of GO Transit's active locomotive fleet consists of MP40PH-3C diesel-electric locomotives manufactured by MotivePower in Boise, Idaho. These replaced most of the older EMD F59PH over a 4-year transition program from 2008 to 2011. The new MP40 locomotives are significantly more powerful with 4000 bhp vs the F59's 3000 bhp, and their greater Head End Power capacity allows them to handle 12 coach trains instead of 10.

In 2011, GO Transit ordered 11 MPI MP54AC locomotives, to be rebuilt from existing units, followed by an order for 10 new build locomotives. MP40PH-3C unit 647 was sent back to Boise for conversion with a Cummins QSK-95 diesel engine into an MP54 in 2012, and was completed in 2015 (although dual Cummins QSK-60 engines were substituted instead). Testing of the first MP54AC began in December 2015, and the locomotive was formally delivered in March 2016, by which time GO Transit had increased its order for newbuild units to 16, for a total of 26. The order of 10 rebuilt units was later converted to newbuilds, the first of which was delivered in March 2018. While they are technically model MP54ACs, GO classifies them as MP40PHT-T4AC units.

Retired

Coaches

GO's railcar fleet is composed exclusively of Bombardier BiLevel Coaches manufactured by Bombardier Transportation or its predecessors in Thunder Bay, Ontario. In November 2021, the fleet comprised a total of 949 railcars, including cab car variants.

On June 1, 2012, Metrolinx contracted Bombardier to manufacture an additional 60 bilevel cars of an updated design incorporating crash energy management features and improved  Deliveries of these models have been ongoing since 2015.

Bus

GO Transit currently operates two types of buses: single-decker highway coaches, constituting 75% of the active fleet; and commuter-type double-decker buses, constituting the remaining 25%. All vehicles run on diesel fuel.
The current highway coach fleet consists exclusively of D4500-model coaches built by Motor Coach Industries (numbered from 2100 onwards). The first of these coaches were ordered in 2001 and orders have continued until 2015. All orders since 2005 (from 2267 onwards) are of a facelifted design, designated as D4500CT, and two of these vehicles (3000 and 3001), ordered in 2008, have a hybrid-electric drivetrain and are model D4500CTH. Older vehicles in the fleet are retired after reaching a certain mileage; as of 2017, the oldest vehicles in the active fleet were made in 2004.
The double-decker fleet uses Alexander Dennis Enviro500s. They come in three distinct configurations, differing mainly in height and distinguishable external appearance:
Built in Falkirk, Scotland, they entered service in 2008, but their height prevents them from meeting many height standards set by the provincial Ministry of Transportation, restricting their usage to the Highway 407 and Highway 403 corridors, providing service between Peel and York Regions.
This variant, also made in Falkirk, entered service in 2012, and their lower height allows these buses to meet many more clearance standards as a result and are used on a wider variety of routes, including those that travel on Highway 401 into Durham Region.
Developed specifically for the GO Transit network, it is capable of accessing bus terminals with height restrictions that prevent previous double-deckers accessing them. They are also the first double-decker buses to be manufactured locally (from a newly established facility in Vaughan). The first of these vehicles entered service in 2016 and orders are ongoing to replace older single-decker coaches. By 2020, Metrolinx estimates that 75% of the active fleet would be composed of double-deckers.

Active

Retired
Previously, GO Transit also operated suburban-style transit buses from General Motors, Orion Bus Industries, and New Flyer Industries, and motor coaches by Prevost Car. GM buses were manufactured in London, Ontario and Orion buses in Mississauga, Ontario. All of these older vehicles are now retired.

Support vehicles

References

External links

 

GO Transit